Laurence Edgar Skog (born April 9, 1943) is an American botanist who specializes in the flowering plant family Gesneriaceae.

Laurence Edgar Skog was born in Duluth, Minnesota, the oldest of four children. Skog was a graduate of the University of Minnesota at Duluth from where he received a Bachelor of Arts  in botany with a minor in chemistry in (1965). Skog earned his Master of Science  in botany at the University of Connecticut at Storrs (1968) and PhD in plant taxonomy from Cornell University in 1972.

From 1973 to 2003 Skog was a curator and research scientist in the Botany Department of the Smithsonian Institution's National Museum of Natural History.  Since his retirement in 2003 he has continued to work at the museum as an emeritus curator.

References

External links
 Laurence Edgar Skog
International Plant Names Index

1943 births
Living people
20th-century American botanists
21st-century American botanists
American people of Swedish descent
People from Duluth, Minnesota
University of Connecticut alumni
Cornell University alumni
University of Minnesota Duluth alumni
Scientists from Minnesota
Smithsonian Institution people